Rajan Gurung (born 15 April 2000) is a Nepali footballer who plays as a midfielder for Nepali club Kathmandu Rayzrs and the Nepal national team.

He began playing football at his early age as striker or forward in 'Trinity Club' Academy ,a local club in waling , syangja and also represent in Inter-School National Tournament .

Style of play 
He is generally deployed as defensive midfielder but can play as defender in any defensive positions .He is  an intelligent, physically strong , aggressive and with an extremely high work-rate

References

External links
 

Living people
2000 births
Nepalese footballers
Nepal international footballers
Association football midfielders